Āyatana (Pāli; Sanskrit: आयतन) is a Buddhist term that has been translated as "sense base", "sense-media" or "sense sphere". In Buddhism, there are six internal sense bases (Pali: ajjhattikāni āyatanāni; also known as, "organs", "gates", "doors", "powers" or "roots") and six external sense bases (bāhirāni āyatanāni or "sense objects"; also known as vishaya or "domains").

There are six internal-external (organ-object)  (Pāli; Skt. ), pairs of sense bases:

 eye and visible objects
 ear and sound
 nose and odor
 tongue and taste
 body and touch
 mind and mental objects

Buddhism and other Indian epistemologies identify six "senses" as opposed to the Western identification of five. In Buddhism, "mind" denotes an internal sense organ which interacts with sense objects that include sense impressions, feelings, perceptions and volition.

In the Pali Canon
In the Four Noble Truths, the Buddha identifies that the origin of suffering (Pali, Skt.: dukkha) is craving.  In the chain of Dependent Origination, the Buddha identifies that craving arises from sensations that result from contact at the six sense bases (see Figure 2 below).  Therefore, to overcome craving and its resultant suffering, one should develop restraint of and insight into the sense bases.

Sense-base contexts 

Throughout the Pali Canon, the sense bases are referenced in hundreds of discourses. In these diverse discourses, the sense bases are contextualized in different ways including:

 Sextets (Pali: chakka):The sense bases include two sets of six: six sense organs (or internal sense bases) and six sense objects (or external sense bases).  Based on these six pairs of sense bases, a number of mental factors arise.  Thus, for instance, when an ear and sound are present, the associated consciousness arises.  The arising of these three elements (dhātu) – ear, sound and ear-related consciousness – lead to what is known as "contact" (phassa) which in turn causes a pleasant or unpleasant or neutral "feeling" or "sensation" (vedanā) to arise.  It is from such a feeling that "craving" arises.  (See Figure 1.) Such an enumeration can be found, for instance, in the "Six Sextets" discourse (Chachakka Sutta, MN 148), where the "six sextets" (six sense organs, six sense objects, six sense-specific types of consciousness, six sense-specific types of contact, six sense-specific types of sensation and six sense-specific types of craving) are examined and found to be empty of self.
 "The All" (Pali: sabba):In a discourse entitled, "The All" (SN 35.23), the Buddha states that there is no "all" outside of the six pairs of sense bases. In the next codified discourse (SN 35.24), the Buddha elaborates that the All includes the first five aforementioned sextets (sense organs, objects, consciousness, contact and sensations). References to the All can be found in a number of subsequent discourses. In addition, the Abhidhamma and post-canonical Pali literature further conceptualize the sense bases as a means for classifying all factors of existence.
 The Twelve Dependencies (Pali, Skt.: nidāna):As described in the "Related Buddhist concepts" section below and illustrated in Figure 2, the sense bases are a critical link in the endless round of rebirth known as the Twelve Causes and as depicted in the Wheel of Becoming (Skt.: bhavacakra).

"Aflame with lust, hate and delusion" 

In "The Vipers" discourse (Asivisa Sutta, SN 35.197), the Buddha likens the internal sense bases to an "empty village" and the external sense bases to "village-plundering bandits."  Using this metaphor, the Buddha characterizes the "empty" sense organs as being "attacked by agreeable & disagreeable" sense objects.

Elsewhere in the same collection of discourses (SN 35.191), the Buddha's Great Disciple Sariputta clarifies that the actual suffering associated with sense organs and sense objects is not inherent to these sense bases but is due to the "fetters" (here identified as "desire and lust") that arise when there is contact between a sense organ and sense object.

In the "Fire Sermon" (Adittapariyaya Sutta, SN 35.28), delivered several months after the Buddha's awakening, the Buddha describes all sense bases and related mental processes in the following manner:
"Monks, the All is aflame. What All is aflame? The eye is aflame. Forms are aflame. Consciousness at the eye is aflame. Contact at the eye is aflame. And whatever there is that arises in dependence on contact at the eye – experienced as pleasure, pain or neither-pleasure-nor-pain – that too is aflame. Aflame with what? Aflame with the fire of passion, the fire of aversion, the fire of delusion. Aflame, I tell you, with birth, aging & death, with sorrows, lamentations, pains, distresses, & despairs."

Extinguishing suffering's flame 

The Buddha taught that, in order to escape the dangers of the sense bases, one must be able to apprehend the sense bases without defilement.  In "Abandoning the Fetters" (SN 35.54), the Buddha states that one abandons the fetters "when one knows and sees ... as impermanent" (Pali: anicca) the six sense organs, objects, sense-consciousness, contact and sensations. Similarly, in "Uprooting the Fetters" (SN 35.55), the Buddha states that one uproots the fetters "when one knows and sees ... as nonself" (anatta) the aforementioned five sextets.

To foster this type of penetrative knowing and seeing and the resultant release from suffering, in the Satipatthana Sutta (MN 10) the Buddha instructs monks to meditate on the sense bases and the dependently arising fetters as follows:
"How, O bhikkhus, does a bhikkhu live contemplating mental object in the mental objects of the six internal and the six external sense-bases?
"Here, O bhikkhus, a bhikkhu understands the eye and material forms and the fetter that arises dependent on both (eye and forms); he understands how the arising of the non-arisen fetter comes to be; he understands how the abandoning of the arisen fetter comes to be; and he understands how the non-arising in the future of the abandoned fetter comes to be. [In a similar manner:] He understands the ear and sounds ... the organ of smell and odors ... the organ of taste and flavors ... the organ of touch and tactual objects ... the consciousness and mental objects....
"Thus he lives contemplating mental object in mental objects ... and clings to naught in the world."

In post-canonical Pali texts
The Vimuttimagga, the Visuddhimagga, and associated Pali commentaries and subcommentaries all contribute to traditional knowledge about the sense bases.

Understanding sense organs

When the Buddha speaks of "understanding" the eye, ear, nose, tongue and body, what is meant?

According to the first-century CE Sinhalese meditation manual, Vimuttimagga, the sense organs can be understood in terms of the object sensed, the consciousness aroused, the underlying "sensory matter," and an associated primary or derived element that is present "in excess." These characteristics are summarized in the table below.

The compendious fifth-century CE Visuddhimagga provides similar descriptors, such as "the size of a mere louse's head" for the location of the eye's "sensitivity" (Pali: pasāda; also known as, "sentient organ, sense agency, sensitive surface"), and "in the place shaped like a goat's hoof" regarding the nose sensitivity (Vsm. XIV, 47–52). In addition, the Visuddhimagga describes the sense organs in terms of the following four factors:
 characteristic or sign (lakkhaa)
 function or "taste" (rasa)
 manifestation (paccupahāna)
 proximate cause (padahāna)
Thus, for instance, it describes the eye as follows:
Herein, the eye's characteristic is sensitivity of primary elements that is ready for the impact of visible data; or its characteristic is sensitivity of primary elements originated by kamma sourcing from desire to see.  Its function is to pick up [an object] among visible data.  It is manifested as the footing of eye-consciousness.  Its proximate cause is primary elements born of kamma sourcing from desire to see.

In regards to the sixth internal sense base of mind (mano), Pali subcommentaries (attributed to Dhammapāla Thera) distinguish between consciousness arising from the five physical sense bases and that arising from the primarily post-canonical notion of a "life-continuum" or "unconscious mind" (bhavaga-mana):
"Of the consciousness or mind aggregate included in a course of cognition of eye-consciousness, just the eye-base [not the mind-base] is the 'door' of origin, and the [external sense] base of the material form is the visible object.  So it is in the case of the others [that is, the ear, nose, tongue and body sense bases].  But of the sixth sense-base the part of the mind base called the life-continuum, the unconscious mind, is the 'door' of origin...."

The roots of wisdom
In the fifth-century CE exegetical Visuddhimagga, Buddhaghosa identifies knowing about the sense bases as part of the "soil" of liberating wisdom.  Other components of this "soil" include the aggregates, the faculties, the Four Noble Truths and Dependent Origination.

Related Buddhist concepts

Aggregates (Pali, khandha; Skt., skandha):In a variety of suttas, the aggregates, elements (see below) and sense bases are identified as the "soil" in which craving and clinging grow. In general, in the Pali Canon, the aggregate of material form includes the five material sense organs (eye, ear, nose, tongue and body) and associated sense objects (visible forms, sounds, odors, tastes and tactile objects); the aggregate of consciousness is associated with the sense organ of mind; and, the mental aggregates (sensation, perception, mental formations) are mental sense objects.    Both the aggregates and the sense bases are identified as objects of mindfulness meditation in the Satipatthana Sutta. In terms of pursuing liberation, meditating on the aggregates eradicates self-doctrine and wrong-view clinging while meditating on the sense bases eradicates sense-pleasure clinging.

Dependent Origination (Skt.: pratitya-samutpada):As indicated in Figure 2 above, the six sense bases are the fifth link in the Twelve Causes (nidāna) of the chain of Dependent Origination and thus likewise are the fifth position on the Wheel of Becoming (bhavacakra). The arising of the six sense bases is dependent on the arising of material and mental objects (Pali, Skt.: nāmarūpa); and, the arising of the six sense bases leads to the arising of "contact" (Pali: phassa; Skt.: sparśa) between the sense bases and consciousness (Skt.: visjñāna) which results in pleasant, unpleasant and neutral feelings (Pali, Skt.: vedanā).
Elements (Pali, Skt.: dhātu):The eighteen elements include the twelve sense bases. The eighteen elements are six triads of elements where each triad is composed of a sense object (the external sense bases), a sense organ (the internal sense bases) and the associated sense-organ-consciousness. In other words, the eighteen elements are made up of the twelve sense bases and the six related sense-consciousnesses.
Karma (Skt.; Pali: kamma):In a Samyutta Nikaya discourse, the Buddha declares that the six internal senses bases (eye, ear, nose, tongue, body and mind) are "old kamma, to be seen as generated and fashioned by volition, as something to be felt." In this discourse, "new kamma" is described as "whatever action one does now by body, speech, or mind."  In this way, the internal sense bases provide a link between our volitional actions and subsequent perceptions.

See also

 Heart Sutra—Mahayana text that shows the ayatanas in Mahayana discourse
 Indriya—"faculties", which include a group of "six sensory faculties" similar to the six sense bases
 Prajna (wisdom)
 Satipatthana Sutta—includes a meditation using sense bases as the meditative object
 Skandha—a similar Buddhist construct
 Twelve Nidanas—the chain of endless suffering of which the sense bases are the fifth link

Notes

References

Sources

 Aung, S.Z. & C.A.F. Rhys Davids (trans.) (1910). Compendium of Philosophy (Translation of the Abhidhamm'attha-sangaha). Chipstead: Pali Text Society.  Cited in Rhys Davids & Stede (1921–5).
 Bodhi, Bhikkhu (ed.) (2000a). A Comprehensive Manual of Abhidhamma: The Abhidhammattha Sangaha of Ācariya Anuruddha. Seattle, WA: BPS Pariyatti Editions. .
 Bodhi, Bhikkhu (trans.) (2000b). The Connected Discourses of the Buddha: A Translation of the Samyutta Nikaya. (Part IV is "The Book of the Six Sense Bases (Salayatanavagga)".) Boston: Wisdom Publications. .
 Bodhi, Bhikkhu (2005a). In the Buddha's Words: An Anthology of Discourses from the Pali Canon. Boston: Wisdom Publications. .
 Bodhi, Bhikkhu (18 Jan 2005b). MN 10: Satipatthana Sutta (continued) (MP3 audio file) [In this series of talks on the Majjhima Nikaya, this is Bodhi's ninth talk on the Satipatthana Sutta. In this talk, the discussion regarding the sense bases starts at time 45:36]. Available on-line at http://www.bodhimonastery.net/MP3/M0060_MN-010.mp3.
 Buddhaghosa, Bhadantācariya (trans. from Pāli by Bhikkhu Ñāṇamoli) (1999). The Path of Purification: Visuddhimagga. (Chapter XV is "The Bases and Elements (Ayatana-dhatu-niddesa)".) Seattle, WA: BPS Pariyatti Editions. .
 Hamilton, Sue (2001). Indian Philosophy: A Very Short Introduction. Oxford: Oxford University Press. .
 Matthews, Bruce (1995). "Post-Classical Developments in the Concepts of Karma and Rebirth in Theravāda Buddhism," in Ronald W. Neufeldt (ed.), Karma and Rebirth: Post-Classical Developments. Delhi, Sri Satguru Publications. (Originally published by the State University of New York, 1986). .
 , Bhikkhu (trans.) & Bodhi, Bhikkhu (ed.) (2001). The Middle-Length Discourses of the Buddha: A Translation of the Majjhima Nikāya. Boston: Wisdom Publications. .
 Rhys Davids, Caroline A.F. ([1900], 2003). Buddhist Manual of Psychological Ethics, of the Fourth Century B.C., Being a Translation, now made for the First Time, from the Original Pāli, of the First Book of the Abhidhamma-Piaka, entitled Dhamma- (Compendium of States or Phenomena). Whitefish, MT: Kessinger Publishing. .
Red Pine. The Heart Sutra: The Womb of the Buddhas (2004) Shoemaker & Hoard. 
 Rhys Davids, T.W. & William Stede (eds.) (1921–5). The Pali Text Society’s Pali–English Dictionary. Chipstead: Pali Text Society. A general on-line search engine for the PED is available at http://dsal.uchicago.edu/dictionaries/pali/.
 Soma Thera (trans.) (1999). The Discourse on the Arousing of Mindfulness (MN 10). Available on-line at Satipatthana Sutta: The Discourse on the Arousing of Mindfulness.
 Soma Thera (2003). The Way of Mindfulness: English translation of the Satipahāna Sutta Commentary. Kandy, Sri Lanka: Buddhist Publication Society. .
 Thanissaro Bhikkhu (trans.) (1993). Adittapariyaya Sutta: The Fire Sermon (SN 35.28). Available on-line at Adittapariyaya Sutta: The Fire Sermon.
 Thanissaro Bhikkhu (trans.) (1997a). Kamma Sutta: Action (SN 35.145). Available on-line at Kamma Sutta: Action.
 Thanissaro Bhikkhu (trans.) (1997b). Kotthita Sutta: To Kotthita (SN 35.191). Available on-line at Kotthita Sutta: To Kotthita.
 Thanissaro Bhikkhu (trans.) (1997c). Suñña Sutta: Empty (SN 35.85). Available on-line at Suñña Sutta: Empty.
 Thanissaro Bhikkhu (trans.) (1998a). Chachakka Sutta: The Six Sextets (MN 148). Available on-line at Chachakka Sutta: The Six Sextets.
 Thanissaro Bhikkhu (trans.) (1998b). Loka Sutta: The World (SN 12.44). Available on-line at Loka Sutta: The World.
 Thanissaro Bhikkhu (trans.) (1998c). Maha-salayatanika Sutta: The Great Six Sense-media Discourse (MN 149). Available on-line at Maha-salayatanika Sutta: The Great Six Sense-media Discourse.
 Thanissaro Bhikkhu (trans.) (1998d). Yavakalapi Sutta: The Sheaf of Barley (SN 35.207). Available on-line at Yavakalapi Sutta: The Sheaf of Barley.
 Thanissaro Bhikkhu (trans.) (2001a). Pahanaya Sutta: To Be Abandoned (SN 35.24). Available on-line at Pahanaya Sutta: To Be Abandoned.
 Thanissaro Bhikkhu (trans.) (2001b). Sabba Sutta: The All (SN 35.23). Available on-line at Sabba Sutta: The All.
 Thanissaro Bhikkhu (trans.) (2004). Asivisa Sutta: Vipers (SN 35.197). Available on-line at Asivisa Sutta: Vipers.
Upatissa, Arahant, N.R.M. Ehara (trans.), Soma Thera (trans.) and Kheminda Thera (trans.) (1995). The Path of Freedom (Vimuttimagga). Kandy, Sri Lanka: Buddhist Publication Society. .
 Vipassana Research Institute (VRI) (trans.) (1996). : The Great Discourse on Establishing Mindfulness (Pali-English edition). Seattle, WA: Vipassana Research Publications of America. .

External links

 "Salayatana Vagga – The Section on the Six Sense Bases" of the Samyutta Nikaya, on www.accesstoinsight.org

Twelve nidānas
Eighteen dhātus
Sanskrit words and phrases